Casa del vento is a left wing Italian folk rock band.

History 

Casa del Vento is an "extremely controversial, Italo-Celtic, Euro-socialist" folk rock band founded in Italy since 1991. Its current members are Luca Lanzi, Sauro Lanzi, Massimiliano Gregorio, Fabrizio Morganti, Andreas Petermann and Riccardo Dellocchio. The band's popular albums are Pane E Rose, Sessant Anni Di Resistenza and Tbc.

Casa del Vento is influenced from Modena City Ramblers (MCR) founded by emilian boys on 17 March 1991, on St. Patrick's day to play Celtic songs in patchanka style, which influenced the most the Italian folk rock in the last 15 years. MCR's first demo-tape was Combat Folk: a musical manifesto: a fusion of Combat Rock by The Clash and folk: traditional Irish excerpt, political songs (Contessa) and partisans' songs (Fischia il vento and Bella Ciao) rearranged with Irish sound. Combat folk will be a new musical genre: folk rock with a strong political and social message.  Later M.C.R. travelled in South America, Morocco, Palestine and South Africa, world sound met rock, punk, loops and samples: the new genre is Celtic patchanka which is a mixture of traditional music, punk, reggae, rock and political lyrics. The singer of the group Cisco along with producer Kaba Cavazzuti who also became "a new member of the Modena City Ramblers after changes in the original line-up", released the album of the ‘brother band’ Casa del Vento, titled "900" which came out in February 2001.

They have been contributed to the 17 track Fuori dal Mucchio "Combat Folk Vol. 2" compilation album (every band 2 track and 1 extra song by Modena City Ramblers) and reviewed as "a young five piece band with strong voice and interesting arrangements".

In 2002, band's Carne da cannone song were published as 7th track in compilation album Tora! Tora! '02 by Mescal Records. tora tora 2002 album

In March 2009, their song Il fuoco e la neve, is selected to the L’Altraradio's Golden Playlist compilation CD published by Repertoire Records.

Casa del Vento is one of the leading artists of Mescal Records (founded 1993).

Members 

Luca Lanzi: vocals, acoustic guitar
Sauro Lanzi: fiati, accordion, trumpet, trombone, tin whistle, piano, organ
Massimiliano Gregorio: bass guitar
Fabrizio Morganti: percussions
Andreas Petermann: violin, viola
Riccardo Dellocchio: electric guitar

Discography 

 1999 - Senza bandiera Self Production 
 1999-2001 (?) - A las barricadas Mescal/Sony Music Entertainment
 2001 - 900 (Stefano "Cisco" Bellotti) Mescal/Sony Music Entertainment 
 2002 - Genova chiama Mescal Records/ Il Manifesto 
 2002 - Pane e rose Mescal Records/Sony BMG
 2003 - Non in mio nome (EP) Mescal/Sony Music Entertainment 
 2004 - Sessant'anni di Resistenza Mescal - Provincia di Arezzo e Comunità Montana/Sony Music Entertainment 
 2005 - Al di là degli alberi Mescal/Sony Music Entertainment 
 2006 - Il grande niente Mescal/Sony BMG 
 2008 - Il fuoco e la neve 2 CD (Casa del Vento compilation) Mescal/EMI
 2009 - Articolo Uno Mescal/Sony BMG 
 2010 - Seeds In The Wind 5-track cd issued exclusively to be sold through Emergency channels 
 2012 - Giorni dell'Eden Mescal/Sony BMG

Participations 

 2001 Italia tour with Roger Lucey
 11 April 2009 Pratovecchio (Arezzo) "SCArtati" concert

See also 

 Modena City Ramblers
 Folk Rock#Italian folk rock
 Italian popular music#Patchanka
 List of folk rock artists

References

External links 
 MySpace Page
 CD Reviews Combat Folk Vol. 2 folkworld.de online music magazine vol. 18
 Yahoo Music Page

Italian folk music groups
Folk rock groups
Musical groups established in 1991
1991 establishments in Italy